The Men's 10 km Classic competition of the Vancouver 2010 Paralympics was held at Whistler Olympic Park in Whistler, British Columbia. The competition took place on Thursday, March 18.

Visually Impaired
In the cross-country skiing 10 km Classic visually impaired, the athlete with a visual impairment has a sighted guide. The two skiers are considered a team, and dual medals are awarded.

Sitting

Standing

References

External links
2010 Winter Paralympics schedule and results , at the official website of the 2010 Winter Paralympics in Vancouver

Men's 10 km Classic
Winter Paralympics